"Spiders & Snakes" is a 1974 hit song recorded by Jim Stafford and written by Stafford and David Bellamy of The Bellamy Brothers. It was the second of four U.S. Top 40 singles released from his eponymous debut album and also the highest-charting at number three. The lyrics in the verses are spoken, while only the chorus is sung.

Lyrics
The song begins with the narrator being asked by a girl, to walk her home from school, which he accepts. She says to him that they should spend some time together instead of being home alone, making the narrator to go to the swimming hole, while she may be thinking of love or sex. While at the swimming hole, the narrator catches a frog on a hollow log, in which he shakes it at her saying "This Frog's for you", causing the girl to tell him that she dislikes spiders and snakes, which is not the way for romance to happen. After a while, the narrator phones her to get together again, in which she says that she'll see him after school. He is nervous this time, thinking of another scheme, when the girl firmly tells him perfectly clear that she repeats her dislike for spiders and snakes, for the same unromantic reasons. (Source: Metro Lyrics)

Commercial performance
"Spiders and Snakes" was a hit in 1974, spending one week at number three on the US Billboard Hot 100. In Canada, the song reached number one.  The song spent five and a half months on the US charts, sold over one million copies, and was awarded a gold disc by the RIAA on March 8, 1974.

Chart performance

Weekly charts

Year-end charts

Cover versions
Loretta Lynn and Conway Twitty included a cover of "Spiders & Snakes" on their 1974 album Country Partners.

References

External links
 Lyrics of this song
 

1973 songs
1974 singles
MGM Records singles
Jim Stafford songs
RPM Top Singles number-one singles
Songs written by David Bellamy (singer)
Swamp rock songs